The Clean Air Express provides commuter bus service in portions of Santa Barbara County, California, with service between the cities of Santa Barbara, Lompoc, Santa Maria, and Goleta, California. In 1991, the service was formed to provide commuter service and to alleviate traffic congestion.  The Clean Air Express is funded by Santa Barbara County Measure A funds.

Route list
Lompoc to Goleta (5 trips in each direction)
Lompoc to Santa Barbara (2 trips in each direction)
Santa Maria to Goleta (3 trips in each direction)
Santa Maria to Santa Barbara (2 trips in each direction)
Solvang and Buellton to Goleta (1 trip in each direction)

References

External links
 

Bus transportation in California
Public transportation in Santa Barbara County, California
Goleta, California
Lompoc, California
Santa Barbara, California
Santa Maria, California